Henry (c.1178 – 11 June 1216) was Latin emperor of Constantinople from 1205 until his death in 1216. He was one of the leaders of the Fourth Crusade in which the Byzantine Empire was conquered and Latin Empire formed.

Life
Henry was born in Valenciennes, France around 1178. He was the son of Count Baldwin V of Hainaut and Countess Margaret I of Flanders. Henry first married (in 1204) Agnes of Montferrat, daughter of Boniface of Montferrat. Henry's only child by his first wife Agnes died in childbirth with his mother.

Some contemporary historians say that Henry made a peace with Bulgarians after the death of Kaloyan, and a marriage was arranged in 1213 between Henry and Maria, daughter of Kaloyan and stepdaughter of Tsar Boril of Bulgaria.

Henry had a daughter with an unnamed mistress. This daughter, whose name is not recorded, probably (Margaret-Isabel) later married Alexius Slav, who established his own state in the Rhodope mountains. He was later given the title of despot.

Leadership in the Fourth Crusade
Having joined the Fourth Crusade in about 1201, he distinguished himself at the siege of Constantinople of 1203 and elsewhere. During the July 1203 siege, Henry was one of eight division generals, the others including Boniface of Montferrat (the crusade leader), Doge Enrico Dandolo (leader of the Venetians), Louis of Blois (one of the first nobles to take the cross), and Henry's own brother, Baldwin IX of Flanders, who controlled the largest division. During the 1204 siege, Henry led a chevauchée expedition to gain supplies and raided a castle in Philia, near the Black Sea with, according to Robert de Clari, about 30 knights and an unspecified number of mounted sergeants. An ambush was laid for him by Emperor Alexius V Ducas, but Henry and his force routed the Greeks soundly, captured a revered icon supposedly containing relics of Christ, and returned to the crusader camp. He soon became prominent among the princes of the new Latin Empire.

In the Latin Empire
When his elder brother, Emperor Baldwin, was captured at the Battle of Adrianople in April 1205 by the Bulgarians, Henry was chosen regent of the empire, succeeding to the throne when the news of Baldwin's death arrived. He was crowned 20 August 1206.

Upon Henry's ascension as Latin emperor, the Lombard nobles of the Kingdom of Thessalonica refused to give him allegiance. A two-year war ensued and after defeating the Templar-supported Lombards, Henry confiscated the Templar castles of Ravennika and Zetouni (Lamia).

Henry was a wise ruler, whose reign was largely passed in successful struggles with Tsar Kaloyan of Bulgaria and with his rival Emperor Theodore I Lascaris of Nicaea. He later fought against Boril of Bulgaria (1207–1218) and managed to defeat him in the Battle of Philippopolis. Henry campaigned against the Nicean Empire, expanding a small holding in Asia Minor (at Pegai) with campaigns in 1207 (at Nicomedia) and in 1211–1212  (with the Battle of the Rhyndacus), where he captured important Nicean possessions at Nymphaion. Though Theodore I Laskaris could not oppose this later campaign, it appears that Henry decided it best to focus on his European problems, for he sought a truce with Theodore I in 1214, and amicably divided Latin from Nicean possessions to the favour of Nicea.

Domestically, Henry appears to have a different character than many of the other Crusader nobles as seen in his even-handed and pragmatic treatment of the Greeks. George Akropolites, the contemporary 13th century Greek historian, notes that Henry "though a Frank by birth, behaved graciously to the Romans who were natives of the city of Constantine, and ranked many of them among his magnates, others among his soldiers, while the common populace he treated as his own people."  Indeed, when a Papal legate (Pelagio Galvani, Cardinal-Bishop of Albano) arrived in Constantinople in 1213 and began to imprison Orthodox clergy and to close churches on the orders of Pope Innocent III, Henry countermanded the orders on the request of the city's Greek clergy.

Henry appears to have been brave but not cruel, and tolerant but not weak, possessing "the superior courage to oppose, in a superstitious age, the pride and avarice of the clergy." The emperor died, poisoned, it is said, by Oberto II of Biandrate, ex-regent of Thessaloniki, on 11 June 1216. Gardner suggests this happened at the instigation of his wife, Maria of Bulgaria.  On his death his brother-in-law Peter Courtenay was crowned emperor in Rome, but never arrived in Constantinople. In the years 1217 to 1219, therefore, the Latin Empire was effectively ruled by Yolanda, Henry's sister and Peter's widow, in regency. The last two Latin emperors were Peter and Yolanda's sons, Robert and Baldwin.

References

Sources

 

1170s births
1216 deaths
13th-century Latin Emperors of Constantinople
Christians of the Fourth Crusade
Deaths by poisoning
House of Hainaut
Regents of the Latin Empire